Pari is a 2018 Pakistani horror film directed by Syed Atif Ali, who also co-wrote the script with Muhammad Ahsan. The film features Pakistani television actors Qavi Khan, Rasheed Naz and Saleem Mairaj.

The film was originally scheduled to be released on 31 October 2017; however, it was released after a delay on 2 February 2018.

Cast
Qavi Khan
Khushi Maheen
Rasheed Naz
Saleem Mairaj
Azekah Daniel
Junaid Akhtar
Faiq Asim

Production
The movie was shot on location at Ayubia National Park. The house where the movie was shot is said to be haunted.

Reception
Rahul Aijaz of The Express Tribune rated 0 stars and said, "The film, in all honesty, is a new low for Pakistani cinema." HIP in Pakistan gave the film a more favourable review and a rating of 7/10, saying "It was a very good attempt by Pakistanis to make a horror movie".

See also
List of Pakistani films of 2018

References

External links
 

2018 films
2018 horror films
2010s Urdu-language films
Pari